Bipolar may refer to:

Astronomy
 Bipolar nebula, a distinctive nebular formation
 Bipolar outflow, two continuous flows of gas from the poles of a star

Mathematics
 Bipolar coordinates, a two-dimensional orthogonal coordinate system
 Bipolar set, a derivative of a polar set
 Bipolar theorem, a theorem in convex analysis which provides necessary and sufficient conditions for a cone to be equal to its bipolar

Medicine
 Bipolar disorder, a mental disorder that causes periods of depression and periods of elevated mood
 Bipolar I disorder, a bipolar spectrum disorder characterized by the occurrence of at least one manic or mixed episode
 Bipolar II disorder, a bipolar spectrum disorder characterized by at least one episode of hypomania and at least one episode of major depression
 Bipolar disorder not otherwise specified, a diagnosis for bipolar disorder when it does not fall within the other established sub-types
 Bipolar neuron, a type of neuron which has two extensions

Music
 Bipolar (Up Dharma Down album), 2008
 Bi-Polar (Vanilla Ice album), 2001
 Bipolar, a 2009 album by rock group El Cuarteto de Nos
"Bipolar", a song by Blonde Redhead from their 1997 album Fake Can Be Just as Good
 "Bipolar", a song by Gloria Trevi from her 2013 album De Película
 "Bipolar", a song by Gucci Mane from his 2018 album Evil Genius
"Bipolar", a 2019 song by Kiiara
"Bi Polar", a 2021 song by Bhad Bhabie

Technology
 Bipolar electricity transmission, using a pair of conductors in opposite polarity
 Bipolar encoding, a type of line code where two nonzero values are used
 Bipolar violation, a violation of the bipolar encoding rules
 Bipolar electric motor, an electric motor with only two poles to its stationary field
 Bipolar (locomotive), a locomotive using a bipolar electric motor
 Bipolar signal, a signal that may assume either of two polarities, neither of which is zero

Transistors
 Bipolar junction transistor (BJT)
 Heterojunction bipolar transistor (HBT)
 Insulated-gate bipolar transistor (IGBT)

Other uses
 Bipolarity, polarity in international relations involving two states

See also
 Dipole (disambiguation)